Markaba is an  village located at Marjayoun municipality at Nabatieh Governorate, Lebanon. It is south of Raabatt Tallame, east of Banni Hayyan and northeast of Tallussah, South Lebanon.

Name  Markaba or Markabah also in Arabic means a vehicle مركبه

E. H. Palmer wrote that the name Merkebeh came from a personal name, from "to ride" or "to lie", as one thing on top of another.

History 
In 1596, it was named as a village, Markaba famous as Marj Kaba, in the Ottoman nahiya (subdistrict) of  Tibnin  under the liwa' (district) of Safad, with a population of fifteen households and one bachelor, all Muslim. The villagers paid a fixed tax rate of 25% on agricultural products, such as wheat, barley, fruit trees, goats and beehives, in addition to "occasional revenues"; a total of 5,110 akçe.

In 1875 Victor Guérin found Markaba to have 150 Metawileh inhabitants. He further noted: "Here a mosque replaces a more ancient sanctuary, temple, or church, to which belonged several fragments of monolithic columns, and good hewn stones scattered about in the village, or built up in the farm-buildings. About twenty rock-cut cisterns and a sarcophagus also go to prove that this was a place of some importance."

In 1881, the PEF's Survey of Western Palestine (SWP)  described it as: "A village, built of stone, containing about 400 Metawileh, situated on top of hill, surrounded by figs, olives, and arable land, with a birket, cisterns and a spring near."

The SWP further noted: "A village containing the remains of an early Christian church; two Corinthian capitals, several broken columns of different sizes, lintels, and some large well-dressed stones scattered about the village. Here is a Greek inscription on a stone, and a cross on another stone. There is a wine-press, rock-cut cisterns, and a dolmen near this village."

Climate 

The average temperature can dip below  in the winter months of December, January and February. During the spring the weather is temperate and mild. The summer is dry and can reach about  during the day.

Resources 

The village depends on agriculture, business, and money transfers from overseas. Most electricity is provided by the government and village's generators.

Population 

The recent population is approximately 3,250 people living in the village. During the holidays or summer season, the maximum population may increase to about 10,000 persons.

Religion 

Almost all of the villagers are Shiites. There are three mosques in the village and one Hussainiyah. The first mosque, in the eastern part of the village, is in good condition. The second mosque, at the center of the village, was damaged during the last war, but underwent reconstruction and is now open.

Families 

Family names in the village include:
Hammoud, Atwi, Zaraket, Chehimi, Chamseddine, Haidar, Younes, Nour El Deen, Mobarak, Shahla, Baydoun, Saleh, Awada, Fahda, Krayani, El Khalil, Bourji, Khames, Mourad, Raghda, El Hasani, Kashmar, El Ashkar, Rida, Dakik, Noureddine and Messelmani.

Economy 

Most local farmers grow olives, wheat and tobacco. Most of the village's income comes from agriculture and money sent from former residents who have overseas jobs or who work in larger cities in Lebanon.

Transportation 

Public transportation in the area takes students from their homes to school daily; there are some taxis which are operated from Marjayoun.

References

Bibliography

External links
Survey of Western Palestine, Map 2:   IAA, Wikimedia commons
 Markaba, Localiban

Populated places in the Israeli security zone 1985–2000
Populated places in Marjeyoun District
Shia Muslim communities in Lebanon